Carvalho's mabuya (Panopa carvalhoi) is a species of skink, a lizard in the family Scincidae. The species is native to northern South America.

Etymology
The specific name, carvalhoi, is in honor of Brazilian herpetologist Antenor Leitão de Carvalho.

Geographic range
P. carvalhoi is found in the Brazilian state of Roraima, and in Venezuela.

Habitat
The preferred natural habitats of P. carvalhoi are forest and savanna.

Reproduction
P. carvalhoi is viviparous.

References

Further reading
Rebouças-Spieker, Regina; Vanzolini, Paulo Emilio (1990). "Mabuya carvalhoi, espécie nova do estado de Roraima, Brasil (Sauria: Scincidae)". Revista Brasileira de Biologia 50 (2): 377–386. (Mabuya carvalhoi, new species). (in Portuguese).
Rivas GA, Molina CR, Ugueto GN, Barros TR, Barrio-Amorós CL, Kok PJR (2012). "Reptiles of Venezuela: an updated and commented checklist". Zootaxa 3211: 1–64.

Panopa
Reptiles described in 1990
Taxa named by Regina Rebouças-Spieker
Taxa named by Paulo Vanzolini